The Textulariacea is a superfamily of Middle Jurassic to Holocene agglutinated benthic textulariid Foraminifera. Tests are trochospiral, triserial, or biserial in early stages; later may be biserial or uniserial. Walls are agglutinated, made of gathered material cemented together and are canaliculate - contain micro-tubular cavities extending between the inner and outer surfaces.

The Textulariacea comprises eight families, as indicated.

References

 Textulariacea in Loeblich and Tappan, 1988, Foraminferal genera and their classification 

Foraminifera superfamilies
Globothalamea